Mamta Bhupesh is an Indian politician and current Minister of Women and Child Development (Independent Charge), Public Grievances Redressal, Minority Affairs, Waqf in government of Rajasthan. She is   a  member of the Rajasthan Legislative Assembly representing the Sikrai Vidhan Sabha constituency of Rajasthan and Indian National Congress.

References

Living people
1973 births
Indian National Congress politicians from Rajasthan
Rajasthan MLAs 2008–2013
Rajasthan MLAs 2018–2023